Gvardeysky (masculine), Gvardeyskaya (feminine), or Gvardeyskoye (neuter) is the name of several rural localities in Russia:
Gvardeysky, Rostov Oblast, a settlement in Alexeyevskoye Rural Settlement of Matveyevo-Kurgansky District in Rostov Oblast
Gvardeysky, Dubensky District, Tula Oblast, a settlement in Gvardeysky Rural Okrug of Dubensky District in Tula Oblast
Gvardeysky, Kireyevsky District, Tula Oblast, a settlement in Podosinovsky Rural Okrug of Kireyevsky District in Tula Oblast
Gvardeysky, Volgograd Oblast, a khutor in Zakharovsky Selsoviet of Kletsky District in Volgograd Oblast
Gvardeyskoye, Chechen Republic, a selo in Gvardeyskaya Rural Administration of Nadterechny District in the Chechen Republic
Gvardeyskoye, Kabardino-Balkar Republic (or Gvardeysky), a selo in Prokhladnensky District of the Kabardino-Balkar Republic; 
Gvardeyskoye, Kaliningrad Oblast, a settlement in Gvardeysky Rural Okrug of Bagrationovsky District in Kaliningrad Oblast
Gvardeyskoye, Krasnodar Krai, a selo in Kiyevsky Rural Okrug of Krymsky District in Krasnodar Krai; 
Gvardeyskoye, Leningrad Oblast, a settlement in Goncharovskoye Settlement Municipal Formation of Vyborgsky District in Leningrad Oblast; 
Gvardeyskoye, Saratov Oblast, a selo in Krasnoarmeysky District of Saratov Oblast